Walter Edwards (26 June 1924 – 5 November 2018) was an English professional footballer who played in the Football League for Leeds United and Mansfield Town.

References

1924 births
2018 deaths
English footballers
Association football forwards
English Football League players
Mansfield Town F.C. players
Leeds United F.C. players
Leicester City F.C. players
Rochdale A.F.C. players
Boston United F.C. players